Bertholf is a Dutch surname, originating from namesake area in Netherlands.

It may refer to:

Guiliam Bertholf, voorleser.
Robert Bertholf, author and professor at the University at Buffalo.
Ellsworth P. Bertholf, Congressional Gold Medal recipient.
Wallace Bertholf, commander of the USS Harrisburg.

See also
USCGC Bertholf (WMSL-750)
Berthold

References